Sirisena Hettige  (born 15 July 1920) was a Ceylonese politician. A member of the United National Party, he was a parliamentarian for Hakmana electorate in Matara district. Hettige was born in Matara and educated at Mahinda College, Galle, where he was an outstanding cricketer during his school days. He was a planter by profession and was a director of the Sri Lanka State Plantation Corporation.

References

External links
 History of  Lovers' Quarrel

1920 births
Alumni of Mahinda College
United National Party politicians
Members of the 6th Parliament of Ceylon
Possibly living people